Ga is a Kwa language spoken in Ghana, in and around the capital Accra. There are also some speakers in Togo, Benin and Western Nigeria. It has a phonemic distinction between three vowel lengths.

Classification
Ga is a Kwa language, part of the Niger–Congo family. It is very closely related to Adangme, and together they form the Ga–Dangme branch within Kwa.

Ga is the predominant language of the Ga people, an ethnic group of Ghana. Ethnic Ga family names (surnames) include Owoo, Lartey, Nortey, Aryee, Poku, Lamptey, Tetteh, Ankrah, Tetteyfio, Laryea, Ayitey, Okine, Bortey, Quarshie, Quaye, Quaynor, Ashong, Kotei, Clottey, Nai, Sowah, Odoi, Maale, Ako, Adjetey, Annang, Addo, Yemoh, Abbey and Adjei.

Geographic distribution
Ga is spoken in south-eastern Ghana, in and around the capital Accra. It has relatively little dialectal variation. Although English is the official language of Ghana, Ga is one of 16 languages in which the Bureau of Ghana Languages publishes material.

Phonology

Consonants
Ga has 31 consonant phonemes.

 may be realised as  when between a consonant and vowel
 has an allophone  before nasal vowels

Vowels
Ga has seven oral vowels and five nasal vowels. All of the vowels have three different vowel lengths: short, long or extra long (the latter appears only in the simple future and the simple past negative forms).

Tones
Ga has two tones, high and low. Like many West African languages, it has tone terracing.

Phonotactics
Ga syllables may also consist solely of a syllabic nasal, for example in the first syllable of ŋshɔ, "sea".

Writing system
Ga was first written in about 1764, by Christian Jacob Protten (1715–1769), who was the son of a Danish soldier and a Ga woman. Protten was a Gold Coast Euro-African Moravian missionary and educator in the eighteenth century. In the mid-1800s, the Germany missionary, Johannes Zimmermann (1825–1876), assisted by the Gold Coast historian, Carl Christian Reindorf (1834–1917) and others, worked extensively on the grammar of the language, published a dictionary and translated the entire Bible into the Ga language. The orthography has been revised a number of times since 1968, with the most recent review in 1990. 

The writing system is a Latin-based alphabet and has 26 letters. It has three additional letter symbols which correspond to the IPA symbols. There are also eleven digraphs and two trigraphs. Vowel length is represented by doubling or tripling the vowel symbol, e.g. 'a', 'aa' and 'aaa'. Tones are not represented. Nasalisation is represented after oral consonants where it distinguishes between minimal pairs.

The Ga alphabet is:
Aa, Bb, Dd, Ee, Ɛɛ, Ff, Gg, Hh, Ii, Jj, Kk, Ll, Mm, Nn, Ŋŋ, Oo, Ɔɔ, Pp, Rr, Ss, Tt, Uu, Vv, Ww, Yy, Zz

The following letters represent sounds which do not correspond with the same letter as the IPA symbol (e.g. B represents ):
J j - 
Y y - 

Digraphs and trigraphs:
Gb gb - 
Gw gw - 
Hw hw - 
Jw jw - 
Kp kp - 
Kw kw - 
Ny ny - 
Ŋm ŋm - 
Ŋw ŋw -  (an allophone rather than a phoneme)
Sh sh - 
Ts ts - 
Shw shw - 
Tsw tsw -

See also
 Ga people
 Languages of Ghana
Christian Jacob Protten
 Carl Christian Reindorf
 Johannes Zimmermann

Footnotes

References

External links

My First GaDangme Dictionary kasahorow
Short tutorial on counting in the Ga language
Young boy speaking about Ghanaian tribes in Ga language

Ga–Dangme languages
Languages of Ghana